The ENGIE OPEN Biarritz (previously known as the Open GDF Suez de Biarritz) is a tournament for professional female tennis players played on outdoor clay courts. The event is classified as a $60,000 ITF Women's Circuit tournament and has been held in Biarritz, France, since 2003 (then a $25,000 category tournament).

Past finals

Singles

Doubles

External links
  
 ITF search

ITF Women's World Tennis Tour
Clay court tennis tournaments
Tennis tournaments in France
Recurring sporting events established in 2003